Mombuca is a municipality in the state of São Paulo in Brazil. The population is 3,508 (2020 est.) in an area of 134 km². The elevation is 550 m.

References

Municipalities in São Paulo (state)